Brachyopidae is an extinct family of temnospondyl labyrinthodonts. They evolved in the early Mesozoic and were mostly aquatic. Brachyopids were the only group of temnospondyls to survive into the Jurassic aside from their sister family Chigutisauridae. With records of the family from the Jurassic of Asia.

List of genera

Banksiops
Batrachosaurus
Batrachosuchoides
Batrachosuchus
Brachyops 
Gobiops 
Notobrachyops 
Platycepsion 
Sinobrachyops 
Vanastega
Xenobrachyops

References

External links
Brachyopidae at Palaeos.

Brachyopids
Amphibian families